Norbert Müller (born 10 February 1986) is a German politician. Born in Wriezen, Brandenburg, he represents The Left. Norbert Müller has served as a member of the Bundestag from the state of Brandenburg since 2014.

Life 
Müller grew up in Strausberg. Since graduating from high school in 2005, Norbert Müller has been studying history as well as lifestyle, ethics and religion at the University of Potsdam. From 2010 to 2013 he was an assistant to Sabine Wils, MEP. He became member of the bundestag in 2014. He is a member of the Committee for Family, Senior Citizens, Women and Youth.

References

External links 

  
 Bundestag biography 

1986 births
Living people
Members of the Bundestag for Brandenburg
Members of the Bundestag 2017–2021
Members of the Bundestag 2013–2017
Members of the Bundestag for The Left